Hércules de Alicante Club de Fútbol "B" is a Spanish football team located in Alicante. It is the reserve team of Hércules CF and currently plays in Tercera División RFEF – Group 6. 

Unlike in England, reserve teams in the Spain play in the same football pyramid as their senior team rather than a separate league. However, reserve teams cannot play in the same division as their senior team. Reserve teams are also no longer permitted to contest the Copa del Rey.

History 
The first reserve football team of Hércules CF was Alicante CF in the 1960s. In 1974, the reserve club was Hércules Atlético (Hércules Athletic), which ran until the early 1980s. After the disappearance of the subsidiary, in the 1980s, Hércules Promesas (Hércules Promises) was founded, with which it was decided after several seasons away. In the 1990s, it became a subsidiary agreements clubs Mutxamel CF and Español San Vicente. In 1996, he returned to create a subsidiary itself, this time called Hércules B that lasts until today.

Club background
Hércules Atlético — (1974–76; 1977–1978)
Hércules Promesas — (1976–77; 1978–1996)
Hércules Club de Fútbol "B" – (1996–)

Season to season

3 seasons in Tercera División
1 season in Tercera División RFEF

Notable former players

Reserve team coach history
Hércules Atlético
  Manolet (1974–1977)
  Emilio Aparicio Rodríguez (1977–1978)

Hércules Promesas
  Mariano Vivancos Sánchez, "Loves" (1978–1979)
  Juan Antonio Carcelén (1985–1987)
  Joaquín Carbonell (1987–1988)
  Manuel Murcia (1988–1989)
  Juan Antonio Carcelén (1989–1990)

Hércules B
  Charles (1996–1998)
  Humberto Núñez (1998–2000)
  Joaquín Carbonell (2000)
  Teo Rastrojo (2000–2001)
  David de la Hera (2001–2002)
  Josip Višnjić (2002–2003)
  Quique Medina (2003)
  Pedro Valdo (2003–2004)
  Juan Sanchís (2004–2005)
  Segundo Amorós (2005–2008)
  Charles (2008–2009)
  Ángel Linares (2009–2011)
  Vicente Borge (2011–2013)
  José Vicente Lledó (2013–)

Achievements 

 Segunda Regional:
 Winners (1): 1996–97
 Primera Regional:
 Winners (1): 1998–99
 Regional Preferente:
 Winners (1): 2002–03

References

External links 
Official website
ffcv.es profile 
Futbolme.com profile

 
Football clubs in the Valencian Community
Association football clubs established in 1996
Spanish reserve football teams
Divisiones Regionales de Fútbol clubs
1996 establishments in Spain